Kuriyedathu Thatri or Kuriyedathu Savitri was a Nambuthiri woman from Kerala, India, known for going through the Smarthavicharana (cast based trial for adultery) in 1905. Often called as Thathri Kutty, her Smarthavicharam is considered as the most controversial one held in Kerala as it shocked the core of the patriarchal and misogynistic society and culture in the state. She is considered by many as one of the first feminist from Kerala who raised voice against the patriarchy that dominated the state. Following the trial of Thathri, a council called Yogakhsemam were formed under few revolutionary Namboothiri men who promoted ideas such as relaxation of marriage rules and abolishing of Sambandham. Her trial was a turning point in Kerala's history for women and their liberation.

Early life
Tatri was born in Kalpakasseri Illam in Thalapally taluk of today's Thrissur district as the daughter of Ashtamurthy Namboothiri of Kalpakasseri Illam. As per records, she is said to have born in 1885. After her birth, an astrologer is said to have told her father that Thatri's birth was “destined to bring calamity and destroy the family’s honour. At the age of 9, Thathri went to her aunty's house near Kunnamkulam to learn singing from  Nambeeshan. Tatri's statement during the trial says that she was sexually harassed there for 12 consecutive days by her relative Musamburi Nampyathan. She is said to have got married in between the age of 11-13 to Raman Namboothiri of Chemmanthite Kuriyedathillam, who was at early 60's. Raman had multiple wives and regularly hired prostitutes to his house. Later Thathri split with Raman. How she split with her husband is still unclear, but several sources state that he abandoned Thathri after she protested against bringing other women and prostitutes to their home. With Raman abandoning her, Thathri was forced to do the sex work. It is still not known whether it was Thatri's helplessness or her own choice that made her to be choose prostitution. Thathri was said to be extremely beautiful and the men who had sex with her came from various castes with some of them possessing influential power in the society. People who visited her did not knew she was an antharjanam (Married namboothiri woman)  and these visits were arranged through her servant. It is said that one day Thatri came across her husband itself who recognised her.

The trial

Smarthavicharam was a notorious ritualistic trial for adultery practiced among the Brahmins of Kerala. If the accused women was found guilty, she and the men found involved with her (known as jāran) were excommunicated from the caste (Bhraṣṭû) and banished. When Raman Namboothiri reported Thatri's matter in the concerned Namboothiri meeting, an investigation was started against Thatri for infidelity and promiscuity. Some people suggest that it was Thatri's neighbour who reported about Thatri's acts in the meeting. By the end of 1904, Tathri's first smarthavicharam was already over. But due to the controversies, the King ordered to conduct the smarthavichara once more. On 13 July 1905, her second trial was conducted. During the trial Thathri admitted to all accusations and in return demanded that the law should be administered equally to everyone. Thatri revealed that she was sexually harassed or had mutual consentual sex with 30 Namboodiris, 13 ambalavaasis, 10 Iyers, 11 Nairs and 1 Syrian Christian. Many of the people Tatri said she had sex with were her close relatives, including her father and her father's half-brother, who sexually harassed her. The list also included renowned scholars, musicians, Kathakali artistes ranging from a 14 year boy to 85 year old man.

Despite many men denied being involved, Thatri confirmed their identities by recalling the birthmarks and moles on the private parts of their bodies. She was able to even remember the exact date, time and place when they slept together. She also produced various written and visual evidence like letters that were written to her. This trial led to these men losing the credibility in the society. Based on the records, many historians argue that the king had a special interest in Thatri's trial. Bhaskaranunni in his book says that this must be because an allegation that the king or a close relative of the king was among those who had sex with the Tathri.  During the seven-month-long trial in three locations under heavy security, each name was called out by Thatri. It is said that when she was about to tell the 65th name, Tatri asked holding up a ring; Do I need to say this name too? The trial was reportedly ended by the King after this incident. Rumour has it that the King abruptly ended the trial because he believed he would be the 65th name to be revealed. Another theory is that that when Thathri was about to tell the name of the 65th man, families in the nearby villages and families from outside the village, became concerned that she might name someone from their families, and the trial was forced to halt. It is also said that Thatri called out the name of many men during the trial to took revenge against them as they sexually harassed her during her childhood. For the first time in the history of Smarthavichara, the accused were allowed to conduct a cross-examination during the trial of Thatri.

Kavunkal Shankarapanicker, Katalath Madhavan Nair, Panangavil Narayananambiar and Achyutapothuwal, who were famous Kathakali artists of that time, quit their jobs and left their village because of the disgrace of having their secret relationship with Thatri.

Life after the trial
After the trial, she was excommunicated along with the men. As per the government records, it is finally recorded that Thathri was sent to Chalakudy and settled in a riverside home. There is no record of her life after that. However there are many popular beliefs regarding this. A popular belief is that Tatri converted to Christianity and married a Christian. Pavithran in his book 'British Commission to India' states that she settled down in Coimbatore after marrying an Anglo Indian gangman from the Indian Railways. Vasanthi Sankaranarayanan, the translator of the book Outcaste, states that Thathri lived somewhere in Tamil Nadu until the age of 80. Despite having sex with several men from the age of 9 to 23, there are no records that Tatri getting pregnant or having an abortion. Some historians believe that after her divorce and remarriage, she gave birth to two daughters and a son. There have been other rumours that claimed that a popular Malayalam film actress of the mid-twentieth century is her granddaughter, a claim which the actress later denied.

In popular culture
The life of Kuriyedathu Thathri has been a subject to several books, documentaries and movies. In 1969, Madampu Kunjukuttan wrote the Novel Bhrashtu (Outcaste) based on the real story of Kuriyedath Thathri and her smarthavicharam. Malayalam film Parinayam (1994) by Hariharan is loosely based on Smarthavicharam of Kuriyedath Thathri. In 2021, Taya, the Sanskrit feature film made by G. Prabha was released that tells the life of from a different perspective.

References

Women from Kerala
19th-century Indian women
Indian feminists
History of Kerala
Place of death unknown
Year of death unknown
Year of birth unknown